Liliana Laine (born 1923) was a French film actress known for her roles in Italian cinema during the 1940s. She appeared in thirteen productions including the 1947 historical film Vanity.

Selected filmography
 My Widow and I (1945)
 What a Distinguished Family (1945)
 The Models of Margutta (1946)
 Bullet for Stefano (1947)
 Vanity (1947)

References

External links

Bibliography
 Goble, Alan. The Complete Index to Literary Sources in Film. Walter de Gruyter, 1999.

1923 births
Possibly living people
French film actresses
20th-century French actresses
People from Marne (department)